This is a list of former players of Sarawak Football Association. The club was founded in 1974 by Datuk Haji Taha Ariffin with his assistant from the Sarawak government. They made their debut in the Borneo Cup in 1974 and were elected into the Football League five years later in 1979, before moving into their new Sarawak State Stadium.
Mohd Ali Sapiee is the current record holder of appearance records in both league matches and all competitions having played for the club from 1982 to 2001. Ramos Sari who had an eleven-year spell at Sarawak FA between 1996 and 2006, is the current holder of scoring records in both league and all competitions. The player with the most appearances in all competitions is Roslan Ismail, having made his debut in 1982.

List
The list includes all Sarawak FA players who in competitive matches since 1979 in any semi-pro competition – Malaysia Super League, Malaysia Premier League, Malaysia FA Cup, malaysia Cup, Borneo Cup and Malaysia Charity Shield as well as Asian matches in the AFC Champions League. Substitute appearances are included but wartime fixtures are not.

List of former local players

List of former foreign players

References 

 

Sarawak
Sarawak FA
Association football player non-biographical articles